Donna Jean and the Tricksters is an album by Donna Jean and the Tricksters, a rock band led by former Grateful Dead singer Donna Jean Godchaux-MacKay.  The group, which later changed its name to the Donna Jean Godchaux Band, also features lead guitarist and singer Jeff Mattson, who wrote or co-wrote several songs on the album, along with other members of the Zen Tricksters.

Donna Jean and the Tricksters was released by Dig Records in 2008.

Track listing
 "All I Gotta Say" (Donna Jean Godchaux-MacKay) – 4:59  
 "So Hard" (Dave Diamond) – 5:49  
 "No Better Way" (Will McFarlane) – 4:34  
 "Weight of the World" (Dave Diamond) – 5:26  
 "Shelter" (Donna Jean Godchaux-MacKay, Jeff Mattson) – 5:38  
 "Travelin' Light" (Jeff Mattson, M. Marston) – 7:07  
 "He Said/She Said" (Donna Jean Godchaux-MacKay, Jeff Mattson) – 5:14  
 "Moments Away" (Tom Circosta) – 4:27  
 "Farewell Jack" (Keith Godchaux, Brian Godchaux) – 4:22  
 "A Prisoner Says His Piece" (Jeff Mattson) – 6:57  
 "Me and Kettle Joe" (Donna Jean Godchaux-MacKay) – 13:24  
 "Reno" (Klyph Black, John Edward McNeill) – 4:00

Credits

Donna Jean and the Tricksters
 Klyph Black – bass guitar, vocals
 Tom Circosta – electric guitar, vocals
 Dave Diamond – drums, percussion, vocals
 Donna Jean Godchaux-MacKay – vocals
 Wendy Lanter – vocals
 Jeff Mattson – lead guitar, vocals
 Mookie Siegel – keyboards, vocals

Additional musicians
 Jason Crosby – violin on "He Said/She Said" and "A Prisoner Says His Piece"
 Dave Eggar – cello on "Shelter" and "He Said/She Said"  
 Randi Mattson – handclaps on "Shelter"

Production
 Donna Jean and the Tricksters – producer
 James Brooks – executive producer  
 Joe Napoli – recording
 Tim Stiegler – additional engineering
 Jason Corsaro – mixing  
 Michael Ferretti and Dante Portella – assistant engineers
 Chris Gehringer – mastering
 Gary Houston – cover art and layout
 Susana Millman – photography  
 Dennis McNally – publicity, management

References

Donna Jean Godchaux albums
2008 albums